Trendkill may refer to:

 Six Songs of Hellcity Trendkill, 2002 album by Private Line
 The Great Southern Trendkill, 1996 album by Pantera